Richard Juhlin (born 1962) is a Swedish writer on Champagne and is a freelance journalist

Education
Juhlin is a physical education teacher by training, and was educated at the Swedish School of Sport and Health Sciences in Stockholm. He worked as a teacher in Mälarhöjden before he could make Champagne-related activities his full-time profession in 1986.

Selected books
 Magnum Opus ENG, 2022
 Magnum Opus SWE, 2021
 Champagne Hiking, 2017
 A Scent of Champagne, 2013
 The Champagne Guide, 2008
 4000 Champagnes, 2004
 3000 Champagner, 2002
 The Great Tasting, 2000
 2000 Champagnes, 1999
 Champagneboken, 1995

See also
Tom Stevenson, another prominent Champagne writer.

References

External links
 The Richard Juhlin Champagne Club

1962 births
Living people
Wine writers
Swedish non-fiction writers
Wine critics
Knights of the Order of Agricultural Merit